The Best Western Plus Windsor Hotel at 125 West Lamar Street in Americus, Georgia was built in 1892 to attract winter visitors from the northeastern United States.  The five-story Queen Anne hotel was designed by a Swedish-born architect, Gottfried Leonard Norrman, working in Atlanta.  It featured a hundred rooms and a three-story atrium.  It closed in the early 1970s, but later reopened with 53 guest rooms.

The Windsor is a contributing property within the National Register Americus Historic District. Vice-President Thomas R. Marshall gave a speech from the balcony in 1917, and the soon-to-be New York Governor Franklin D. Roosevelt spoke in the dining room in 1928.  Former President Jimmy Carter (born in nearby Plains, Georgia) has been a supporter of the hotel since its reopening.

References

External links
 Windsor Hotel

Hotel buildings completed in 1892
Hotels in Georgia (U.S. state)
Buildings and structures in Sumter County, Georgia
Hotels established in 1892
Historic district contributing properties in Georgia (U.S. state)
Hotel buildings on the National Register of Historic Places in Georgia (U.S. state)
National Register of Historic Places in Sumter County, Georgia